Physical security information management (PSIM) is a category of software that provides a platform and applications created by middleware developers, designed to integrate multiple unconnected security applications and devices and control them through one comprehensive user interface. It collects and correlates events from existing disparate security devices and information systems (video, access control, sensors, analytics, networks, building systems, etc.) to empower personnel to identify and proactively resolve situations.  PSIM integration enables numerous organizational benefits, including increased control, improved situation awareness and management reporting. 
Ultimately, these solutions allow organizations to reduce costs through improved efficiency and to improve security through increased intelligence.

A complete PSIM software system has six key capabilities:  
 Collection: Device management independent software collects data from any number of disparate security devices or systems.  
 Analysis: The system analyzes and correlates the data, events, and alarms, to identify the real situations and their priority.  
 Verification: PSIM software presents the relevant situation information in a quick and easily  digestible format for an operator to verify the situation. 
 Resolution: The system provides standard operating procedures (SOPs), step-by-step instructions based on best practices and an organization’s policies, and tools to resolve the situation.  
 Reporting: The PSIM software tracks all the information and steps for compliance reporting, training and potentially, in-depth investigative analysis.
 Audit trail: The PSIM also monitors how each operator interacts with the system, tracks any manual changes to security systems and calculates reaction times for each event.

PSIM-based integration
A key differential between PSIM based integration and other forms of physical security system integration is the ability for a PSIM platform to connect systems at a data level, contrasting other forms of integration which interface a limited number of products.  PSIM allows use of open technologies which are compatible with a large number of manufacturers. These PSIM products offer more opportunities for expansion and can reduce implementation costs through greater use of existing equipment. 
PSIM solutions in general are deployed to centralize information to single or multiple control hubs. These are referred to as control rooms or command and control centres (CCC, C4I, etc.).
To be connected with other technologies, is an important feature of any basic PSIM as is the capability to integrate with Open Industry Standards such as (PSIA, ONVIF, ODBC, etc.)

Security systems typically integrated into a PSIM solution include:
 Access control systems
 Automated barriers and bollards
 Building management systems like Heating, HVAC, lifts/elevators control, etc.
 CCTV (closed circuit TV)
 Computer Aided Dispatch systems
 Electronic article surveillance (EAS)
 Fire detection
 GIS mapping systems
 Intercom and IP phone
 Intrusion detection system
 Intrusion systems
 Lighting control system
 Perimeter intrusion detection systems
 Power monitoring system
 Radar-based detection and perimeter surveillance radar
 Security alarm
 Video content analysis
 Video wall

Operator guidance
PSIM solutions manage all of the data produced by the various security applications (where the security application manufacturers API or SDK allows), and aggregates them to produce meaningful intelligence. This in turn is converted to create graphical situation management content; combining relevant visual intelligence, workflow based on on-screen guidance and automated tasks (also referred to as a Common Operating Interface). This is used for both event management and for day to day security operations. Some of the more advanced PSIM products offer dynamic guidance, which can be changed according to the perceived threat level. This threat level is governed by both external intelligence, such as DHS advice and internal intelligence, such as the number of attempted breaches. This level of dynamic guidance again relies on the level of integration achieved with any given manufacturers API or SDK.

Typical deployments
PSIM solutions can be found in a wide range of industry and government sectors across the globe. The following are industries where PSIM deployments can be found;

 Corporate enterprise
 Critical national infrastructure protection
 Education
 Energy, oil & gas
 Healthcare
 Homeland defense
 Industrial & manufacturing
 Law enforcement
 Retail & distribution
 Safe Cities
 Travel & transportation

Examples of PSIM deployments:
 Atlanta Police Foundation and the Atlanta Police Department: Operation Shield Video Integration Center 
 British Transport Police 
 City of Baltimore: CitiWatch video surveillance program
 Ventura Police Department: Video Camera Community Partnership Program 
 Washington Metropolitan Area Transit Authority (WMATA)

Industry bodies
 Open Network Video Interface Forum (ONVIF): open industry forum for the development of a global standard for the interface of IP-based physical security products
 Physical Security Interoperability Alliance (PSIA): a global consortium physical security manufacturers and systems integrators focused on promoting interoperability of IP-enabled security devices
 Security Industry Association: trade association for electronic and physical security solution providers
 OPC Foundation: interoperability standard for the secure and reliable exchange of data
 SIP Forum: advance the adoption of products and services based on the Session Initiation Protocol
 BACnet: data communication protocol for building automation and control networks

References

External links
 EMEA market: Security evolves amid physical, cyber threats (asmag.com, Jul 2017)
 Physical and IT security collaboration: Do the usual(SecurityInfoWatch.com, Sep 2016)
 Managing and Mitigating Business Risk with Security Software (SecurityInfoWatch.com, Sep 2015)
 MNCs global security policies drive convergence (asmag.com, Aug 2015)
 PSIM: A critical element in any safe city program (asmag.com, Aug 2015)
 SSN News Poll: PSIM definitions matter (Security Systems News, Jul 2015)
 How to Choose a PSIM Solution to Fit your Needs (IFSECGlobal.com, Feb 2015)
 Why PSIM is gaining new clout across the world (Qognify, Jan 2015)
 Timing is Everything: Physical Security Information Management (PSIM) (Corporate TechDecisions, Nov 2014)
 How security enhances metro emergency management (asmag.com, Oct 2014)
 Understanding “Real” PSIM (asmag.com, Oct 2014)
 Crossing the Line - Security Across the Transport Sector (Risk UK, May 2014, Issue pages 20-21)
 Managing Security Technology: Should You Adopt a VMS or PSIM? (Campus Safety Magazine, Feb 2014)
 Special Report: Government Security - Sharing Video with Police (SecurityInfoWatch.com, Jun 2013
 Clearing up the confusion over PSIM (SecurityInfoWatch.com, Oct 2010)
 Physical security information management (PSIM): The basics (CSO Online, Oct 2010)

Physical security
Security engineering

Surveillance